This page lists all described species of the spider family Cyrtaucheniidae accepted by the World Spider Catalog :

Acontius

Acontius Karsch, 1879
 A. aculeatus (Simon, 1903) — Equatorial Guinea
 A. africanus (Simon, 1889) — West Africa, Congo
 A. australis (Simon, 1886) — Argentina
 A. hartmanni Karsch, 1879 (type) — Angola
 A. humiliceps (Simon, 1907) — Equatorial Guinea (Bioko)
 A. kiriba Zonstein, 2018 — Burundi
 A. lamottei (Dresco, 1972) — Ivory Coast
 A. lawrencei (Roewer, 1953) — Congo
 A. lesserti (Roewer, 1953) — Congo
 A. machadoi (Lessert, 1938) — Congo
 A. nimba Zonstein, 2018 — Guinea
 A. stercoricola (Denis, 1955) — Guinea

Ancylotrypa

Ancylotrypa Simon, 1889
 A. angulata Roewer, 1953 — Congo
 A. atra Strand, 1906 — Ethiopia, Kenya
 A. barbertoni (Hewitt, 1913) — South Africa
 A. brevicornis (Hewitt, 1919) — South Africa
 A. brevipalpis (Hewitt, 1916) — South Africa
 A. brevipes (Karsch, 1879) — West Africa
 A. breyeri (Hewitt, 1919) — South Africa
 A. bulcocki (Hewitt, 1916) — South Africa
 A. coloniae (Pocock, 1902) — South Africa
 A. cornuta Purcell, 1904 — South Africa
 A. decorata (Lessert, 1938) — Congo
 A. dentata (Purcell, 1903) — South Africa
 A. dreyeri (Hewitt, 1915) — South Africa
 A. elongata Purcell, 1908 — Botswana
 A. fasciata Fage, 1936 — Kenya
 A. flaviceps (Pocock, 1898) — East Africa
 A. flavidofusula (Hewitt, 1915) — South Africa
 A. fodiens (Thorell, 1899) — Cameroon
 A. fossor Simon, 1889 (type) — Central Africa
 A. granulata (Hewitt, 1935) — Botswana
 A. kankundana Roewer, 1953 — Congo
 A. kateka (Roewer, 1953) — Congo
 A. lateralis (Purcell, 1902) — South Africa
 A. magnisigillata (Hewitt, 1914) — South Africa
 A. namaquensis (Purcell, 1908) — South Africa
 A. nigriceps (Purcell, 1902) — South Africa
 A. nuda (Hewitt, 1916) — South Africa
 A. nudipes (Hewitt, 1923) — South Africa
 A. oneili (Purcell, 1902) — South Africa
 A. pallidipes (Purcell, 1904) — South Africa
 A. parva (Hewitt, 1916) — South Africa
 A. pretoriae (Hewitt, 1913) — South Africa
 A. pusilla Purcell, 1903 — South Africa
 A. rufescens (Hewitt, 1916) — South Africa
 A. schultzei (Purcell, 1908) — Namibia
 A. sororum (Hewitt, 1916) — South Africa
 A. spinosa Simon, 1889 — South Africa
 A. tookei (Hewitt, 1919) — South Africa
 A. tuckeri Roewer, 1953 — Congo
 A. vryheidensis (Hewitt, 1915) — South Africa
 A. zebra (Simon, 1892) — South Africa
 A. zeltneri (Simon, 1904) — Ethiopia
 A. zuluensis (Lawrence, 1937) — South Africa

Anemesia

Anemesia Pocock, 1895
 A. andreevae Zonstein, 2018 — Uzbekistan, Tajikistan
 A. birulai (Spassky, 1937) — Turkmenistan
 A. castanea Zonstein, 2018 — Tajikistan
 A. incana Zonstein, 2001 — Tajikistan
 A. infumata Zonstein, 2018 — Tajikistan
 A. infuscata Zonstein, 2018 — Tajikistan
 A. karatauvi (Andreeva, 1968) — Tajikistan
 A. koponeni Marusik, Zamani & Mirshamsi, 2014 — Iran
 A. oxiana Zonstein, 2018 — Tajikistan
 A. pallida Zonstein, 2018 — Tajikistan
 A. parvula Zonstein, 2018 — Tajikistan
 A. pococki Zonstein, 2018 — Turkmenistan
 A. sogdiana Zonstein, 2018 — Uzbekistan, Tajikistan
 A. tubifex (Pocock, 1889) (type) — Afghanistan, Turkmenistan

Bolostromoides

Bolostromoides Schiapelli & Gerschman, 1945
 B. summorum Schiapelli & Gerschman, 1945 (type) — Venezuela

Bolostromus

Bolostromus Ausserer, 1875
 B. fauna (Simon, 1889) — Venezuela
 B. gaujoni (Simon, 1889) — Ecuador
 B. holguinensis Rudloff, 1996 — Cuba
 B. insularis (Simon, 1892) — St. Vincent
 B. panamanus (Petrunkevitch, 1925) — Panama
 B. pulchripes (Simon, 1889) — Venezuela
 B. riveti Simon, 1903 — Ecuador
 B. suspectus O. Pickard-Cambridge, 1911 — Uganda
 B. venustus Ausserer, 1875 (type) — Colombia
 † B. destructus Wunderlich, 1988

Cyrtauchenius

Cyrtauchenius Thorell, 1869
 C. artifex (Simon, 1889) — Algeria
 C. bedeli Simon, 1881 — Algeria
 C. bicolor (Simon, 1889) — Algeria
 C. castaneiceps (Simon, 1889) — Algeria
 C. dayensis Simon, 1881 — Algeria
 C. inops (Simon, 1889) — Algeria
 C. latastei Simon, 1881 — Algeria
 C. longipalpus (Denis, 1945) — Algeria
 C. luridus Simon, 1881 — Algeria
 C. maculatus (Simon, 1889) — Algeria
 C. structor (Simon, 1889) — Algeria
 C. talpa Simon, 1891 — USA
 C. terricola (Lucas, 1846) (type) — Algeria
 C. vittatus Simon, 1881 — Algeria

Fufius

Fufius Simon, 1888
 F. albovittatus (Simon, 1891) — Brazil
 F. annulipes (Mello-Leitão, 1941) — Colombia
 F. antillensis (F. O. Pickard-Cambridge, 1899) — Trinidad
 F. atramentarius Simon, 1888 (type) — Central America
 F. auricomus (Simon, 1891) — Brazil
 F. candango Ortega, Nagahama, Motta & Bertani, 2013 — Brazil
 F. ecuadorensis (Simon, 1892) — Ecuador
 F. funebris Vellard, 1924 — Brazil
 F. jalapensis Ortega, Nagahama, Motta & Bertani, 2013 — Brazil
 F. lanicius (Simon, 1892) — Bolivia
 F. lucasae Guadanucci & Indicatti, 2004 — Brazil
 F. minusculus Ortega, Nagahama, Motta & Bertani, 2013 — Brazil
 F. striatipes (Drolshagen & Bäckstam, 2009) — Brazil

Rhytidicolus

Rhytidicolus Simon, 1889
 R. structor Simon, 1889 (type) — Venezuela

References

Cyrtaucheniidae